The 1980–81 British Ice Hockey season featured the Northern League, the Inter-City League and English League North.

Murrayfield Racers won the Northern League, Blackpool Seagulls won the English League North and Streatham Redskins won the Inter-City League. Murrayfield Racers won the Icy Smith Cup.

Northern League

English League North

Inter-City League

Icy Smith Cup

Final
Murrayfield Racers defeated Streatham Redskins 8-4

Spring Cup
Semifinals
Murrayfield Racers - Fife Flyers 7:5, 8:3
Billingham Bombers - Durham Wasps 11:5, 6:4
Final
The final between the Murrayfield Racers and the Billingham Bombers was not contested.

Southern Cup

Results

References

British
1980 in English sport
1981 in English sport
1980 in Scottish sport
1981 in Scottish sport